Andreja Apostolović (born 16 June 1996) is a Serbian football midfielder who plays as a  midfielder for Radnički Niš in the Serbian SuperLiga.

Career

Radnički Pirot
Born in Pirot, Apostolović passed the youth categories of the local club, Radnički, and joined the first during the 2014–15 season. He made 17 appearances in Serbian League East for Radnički Pirot. He also played in the final cup match of Pirot district, and was in protocol against Vranjska Banja in semifinal cup match of Southern and Eastern Serbia. In the spring half season, he made 15 assists.

Radnički Niš
Apostolović joined Radnički Niš in summer 2015, and signed four-year contract with new club on 26 August 2015. He made his SuperLiga in the 8th fixture of 2015–16 season, against Javor Ivanjica. As a selector of Serbia national under-23 football team, Milan Rastavac invited him to squad for a match against Qatar. During the first half-season, he was mostly used as a back-up player in midfield, but after Anton Zemlianukhin left the club, Apostolović got more space to show his potential. Apostolović scored his first goal for Radnički Niš in 12 fixture of the 2016–17 Serbian SuperLiga season in a match against Bačka Bačka Palanka, played on 15 October 2016.

Career statistics

References

External links
 Andreja Apostolović stats at utakmica.rs
 
 

1996 births
Living people
People from Pirot
Association football midfielders
Serbian footballers
FK Radnički Pirot players
FK Radnički Niš players
Serbian SuperLiga players